The Sumathi Merit Awards are presented annually in Sri Lanka by the Sumathi Group of Companies associated with many commercial brands to uplift the talent of Sri Lankan actors and actresses, as well as technical crew who gained positive reviews from critics for their role in television screen.

The award was first given in 1995. The following is a list of the winners of these awards since 1995.

Awards

References

Sumathi Awards